Oreye is a municipality of Wallonia located in the province of Liège, Belgium. 

On January 1, 2018, Oreye had a total population of 3,912. The total area is 19.64 km² which gives a population density of 199 inhabitants per km². 

The municipality consists of the following districts: Bergilers, Grandville, Lens-sur-Geer, Oreye, and Otrange.

See also
 List of protected heritage sites in Oreye

References

External links
 

Municipalities of Liège Province